Liechtenstein participated at the 2018 Summer Youth Olympics in Buenos Aires, Argentina from 6 October to 18 October 2018.

Competitors

Swimming

Tennis

References

2018 in Liechtenstein sport
Nations at the 2018 Summer Youth Olympics
Liechtenstein at the Youth Olympics